Edward Avery (1851 – 1913) was an English publisher of pornography.  His notable publications include The Whippingham Papers, including poems by Algernon Charles Swinburne, and a pirated edition of Sir Richard Burton's Kama Sutra.  He was an associate of William Lazenby and Leonard Smithers.

After the Post Office (Protection) Act 1884, Avery together with other publishers such as Charles Carrington, William Lazenby and Harry Sidney Nichols moved much of their business to Paris to sell in the United Kingdom by mail order.

After evading prosecution successfully for many years he was finally arrested by Chief Inspector Edward Drew and convicted in 1900.  His stock was destroyed and he retired from business.

References
 Jon R. Godsall, "The Tangled Web: A Life of Sir Richard Burton", Troubador Publishing Ltd, 2008, p. 533
 Patrick J. Kearney, "A history of erotic literature", Macmillan, 1982, pp. 116–117
 Patrick J. Kearney, Gershon Legman, "The Private Case: an annotated bibliography of the Private Case Erotica Collection in the British (Museum) Library", J. Landesman, 1981, pp. 153,171,312
 Peter Mendes, "Clandestine erotic fiction in English, 1800-1930: a bibliographical study", Scolar Press, 1993, pp. 12–13
 Lisa Z. Sigel, "International exposure: perspectives on modern European pornography, 1800-2000", Rutgers University Press, 2005, p. 116
 Donald Serrell Thomas, "Swinburne, the poet in his world", Oxford University Press, 1979, 

1851 births
1913 deaths
English publishers (people)
English pornographers
19th-century English businesspeople